The Village is an American drama television series created by Mike Daniels that premiered on NBC on March 19 and ended on May 21, 2019. The series stars an ensemble cast including Moran Atias, Michaela McManus, Frankie Faison, Jerod Haynes, Grace Van Dien, Warren Christie, Daren Kagasoff, Lorraine Toussaint, and Dominic Chianese.

In May 2019, the series was cancelled after one season.

Premise
The Village follows residents of an apartment building in Brooklyn where "the people who reside in the building have built a bonded family of friends and neighbors". Main characters are: Sarah, a nurse, who is living with her teenage daughter Katie; Gabe, a law student, who helps his grandfather Enzo; Ava, an Iranian immigrant, who has a U.S.-born son and problems with ICE; Nick, a veteran, who is haunted by the past and also is the father of Katie (unbeknownst to her); Ron, the super, and Patricia, a social worker, who are "the heart and soul of the building" The stories are described as "hopeful, heartwarming and challenging ... that prove family is everything—even if it's the one you make with the people around you."

Cast and characters

Main
 Moran Atias as Ava Behzadi, an Iranian refugee and Ben's love interest
 Dominic Chianese as Enzo Napolitano, Gabe's grandfather
 Warren Christie as Nick Porter, a former Army Ranger who lost his right leg in Afghanistan; he is also Katie's father. He owns a decommissioned military dog named Jedi that also lost a leg.
 Frankie Faison as Ron Davis, the super of The Village apartment building and the owner of the bar called Smalls
 Jerod Haynes as Ben Jones, a police officer and Ava's love interest
Daren Kagasoff as Gabe Napolitano, Enzo's grandson and a law student
Michaela McManus as Sarah Campbell, a nurse who works at a nursing home. She is Katie's mother.
Lorraine Toussaint as Patricia Davis, Ron's wife and a social worker
 Grace Van Dien as Katie Campbell, Sarah and Nick's teenage daughter. In the premiere, it is revealed that she is pregnant, and that she does not know that Nick is her father.

Recurring
 Ben Ahlers as Liam, a street artist and Katie's love interest
 Guy Lockard as Gordon, Ron's estranged son
 Hailey Kilgore as Olivia, Gordon's daughter and Ron's granddaughter whom he's not been allowed to see
 Katrina Lenk as Claire, prospective adoptive mother of Katie's baby
 Deborah Ayorinde as Dana
 Nadine Nicole as Amy Bowman
 Kurt Yaeger as Joe
Aimee Carrero as Sofia Lopez
 Mary Beth Peil as Gwendolina Ferrari

Episodes

Production

Development
On January 22, 2018, it was announced that NBC had given the production a pilot order. The pilot was written by Mike Daniels who was also set as an executive producer. Production companies involved with the pilot were set to include Universal Television.

On May 7, 2018, it was announced that NBC had given the production a series order. It was also confirmed that Minkie Spiro would direct and executive produce the pilot. Jessica Rhoades is also set to serve as an executive producer and 6107 Productions will serve as an additional production company. A few days later, it was announced that the series would premiere as a mid-season replacement in the spring of 2019. On December 18, 2018, it was announced that the series would premiere on March 12, 2019 and air weekly on Tuesdays during the 10 p.m. time slot. On February 6, 2019, it was reported that the series premiere had been rescheduled for March 19, 2019 and that the season finale would air on May 21, 2019.

On May 30, 2019, NBC canceled the series after a single season.

Casting
In February 2018, it was announced that Moran Atias, Michaela McManus, Frankie Faison, Jerod Haynes, Grace Van Dien, Warren Christie, Daren Kagasoff, Lorraine Toussaint, and Dominic Chianese had been cast in lead roles in the pilot. On October 11, 2018, it was reported that Amy Carlson had been cast in a guest starring role. In December 2018, it was announced that Hailey Kilgore, Guy Lockard, Katrina Lenk, and Deborah Ayorinde had joined the cast in a recurring capacity.

Reception

Critical response
On review aggregator Rotten Tomatoes, the series holds an approval rating of 23% based on 13 reviews, with an average rating of 4.90/10. The website's critical consensus reads, "The Village commendably attempts to affirm the bonds between neighbors in an urban community, but the series' overeagerness to wring tears from viewers will most likely only prompt them to roll their eyes." On Metacritic, it has a weighted average score of 47 out of 100, based on 8 critics, indicating "mixed or average reviews".

Ratings

References

External links

2010s American drama television series
2019 American television series debuts
2019 American television series endings
English-language television shows
NBC original programming
Television series by Universal Television
Television shows set in New York City